Iron Harvest is a dieselpunk mecha real-time strategy video game developed by King Art Games and published by Deep Silver. The game was released for Windows on September 1, 2020. PlayStation 5 and Xbox Series X/S on October 26, 2021.

Gameplay 
The player can control mecha, infantry and hero units. The game is planned to feature over twenty missions and separate single-player storylines for each of the main three factions. The game has both multiplayer and skirmish modes.

Setting 
The game is set in the 1920+ alternate history universe created by the Polish artist Jakub Różalski, which was popularized by the board game Scythe. The 1920+ universe is inspired by the Polish–Soviet War of 1919–1921, and the game's theme has been described as "dieselpunk mecha". The story is focused on the conflict between three nations in Central and Eastern Europe — Polania, Rusviet and Saxony (based respectively on Poland, Imperial Russia, and Imperial Germany) that occurs sometime in the 1920s, in the aftermath of World War I. The Operation Eagle DLC released in May 2021 adds another playable nation, Usonia (based on the United States).

Plot

Polania Campaign 
Anna Kos is a young girl who lives with her father Piotr in Polania, which has become occupied by the Rusviet army after a truce was signed with Saxony to end a massive war in which Anna's brother Janek was killed. One day, Rusviet troops raid Anna's village looking for a scientist, which turns out to be Piotr, who possesses a prosthetic arm capable of disabling military mechs. Piotr is captured by Colonel Lev Zubov, who intends to force him to access Nikola Tesla's factory. Anna recruits fighters from the Polanian Resistance to rescue her father. They are joined by Anna's uncle Lech, the leader of the Resistance, but they are too late to save Piotr, who is mortally wounded from Colonel Zubov stealing his arm. Piotr tells Anna to warn his colleague Heinrich Steinmetz in the city of Kolno before passing away.

Wanting to avenge her father, Anna joins Lech and the Resistance as they spearhead a relief train into Kolno. Upon reaching the city, Anna is shocked to discover that the Resistance not only shipped in much needed food supplies, but also weapons to arm the local populace with. Anna protests this move, and Lech reveals that he plans to arm the civilians and convince them to rise up, which will provoke Rusviet to purge the entire city, thus breaking their truce with Saxony and reigniting Polania's hatred of them. Anna balks at Lech's plan and knocks him out. She then meets Heinrich, who devises a plan to save the citizens of Kolno. As Heinrich evacuates civilians in an airship, Anna, Lech, and the Resistance stay behind to cover his escape. However, Colonel Zubov manages to capture Anna and Lech.

Zubov reveals that he manipulated the Resistance into attacking Kolno and breaking the truce, as he is part of a faction called Fenris, which seeks to restart the war. He executes Lech, but as he is about to execute Anna, the Polanian Army led by Commander Michał Sikorski attacks, forcing Colonel Zubov to retreat. While Colonel Zubov is able to escape, Anna is able to corner one of his lieutenants, who to her shock turns out to be Janek.

Rusviet Campaign
Janek reveals that four weeks prior, he was attending the peace negotiations as part of the Polanian security detail when the negotiations were attacked by insurgents. Working together with Rusviet officer Olga Morozova, they managed to rescue Tsar Nicholas from his burning palace, but the palace collapsed on top of him, presumably killing him. Realizing that Fenris was behind the attack, Tsar Nicholas tasked Olga with tracking down the group and eliminating them. Meanwhile, Janek, on the verge of death, was saved by Rusviet scientists working under Colonel Zubov, who used salvaged Tesla technology to turn him into a cyborg.

Olga infiltrated the facility and informed Janek that Tesla came out of hiding to warn the leaders of the world about the existence of Fenris, whose sole purpose is to overthrow the current world order. She also revealed that she had swapped Janek's identity with one of Colonel Zubov's soldiers so he would receive life saving treatment and become a mole within Colonel Zubov's inner circle. Olga then followed Colonel Zubov, discovering that he and Tsar Nicholas' advisor Rasputin are both members of Fenris. Olga left to warn Kaiser Friedrich of Saxony while Janek remained at Colonel Zubov's side as he searched for Heinrich, discovering a secret Saxonian missile project in the process. While Heinrich was not at the base, they did discover information about his and Piotr's locations in Polania.

Back in the present, Janek insists on staying by Colonel Zubov's side so he can continue to gather information about Fenris, even when Anna tells him about Piotr and Lech's deaths. Upon linking back up with Colonel Zubov, Janek helps track down and capture Heinrich. Heinrich reveals that they need a transponder to enter Tesla's factory, but that won't protect them from the "Icarus Protocol". Heinrich then commits suicide before he can be interrogated further. Colonel Zubov, however, reveals that Piotr's prosthetic arm can serve as the transponder. Using the transponder, Janek is able to disable the defenses around Tesla's factory. Colonel Zubov's forces press in and capture Tesla. Upon learning that Tesla can remove his cyborg suit, Janek attempts to kill Colonel Zubov but is disabled by the failsafe. However, before Colonel Zubov can execute Tesla, he is held at gunpoint by a Saxonian general.

Saxony Campaign
Saxonian General Gunter von Duisburg recalls troubling memories of the war. At the start of the war, Gunter accompanied Prince Wilhelm in Saxony's offensive into Polania. While successful, the offensive suffered major setbacks due to unexpectedly strong Polanian resistance, and the number of casualties shocked Prince Wilhelm, who became increasingly disillusioned with the war and hateful towards Rusviet. This culminated in him disobeying orders and using chlorine gas against the Rusviets, a move Gunter criticized him for since it would invite similar retaliation from Rusviet. In another mission, Prince Wilhelm loses his nerve and massacres Rusviet prisoners, causing Gunter to strike him, which would disgrace his career and position.

In the present, Gunter is summoned to meet Kaiser Friedrich in Dresden, who has been warned about Fenris by Olga. However, bitter over how Kaiser Friedrich used him as a scapegoat for Prince Wilhelm's crimes, Gunter is reluctant to help him. Eventually, Gunter agrees to help due to their friendship, but Kaiser Friedrich is murdered by Prince Wilhelm, who wants to continue the war against Rusviet, and he frames Gunter. Gunter is forced to flee, and recovers his old mech Brunhilde with the help of engineer Frieda Ruete. With Saxony under Prince Wilhelm's control, Olga suggests that Gunter and his loyalists make their way to Tesla's factory, where they might find asylum.

When they reach Tesla's factory, they find it already under attack by Colonel Zubov's forces. Gunter teams up with the Polanian army, working together with Anna and Commander Sikorski. They manage to break through Colonel Zubov's forces and cause him to flee, but Tesla warns them that the Icarus Protocol has already been triggered, which is a giant automated mech designed to destroy all technology it comes across. The Polanian, Rusviet, and Saxonian forces all unite and work together to destroy the mech, saving the day. Tesla despairs that without the Icarus Protocol, his factory is now vulnerable to another Fenris attack. However, Anna, Olga, and Gunter point out the battle proved that people from the three nations can overcome their differences and work together for a common goal. Inspired, Tesla sets about rebuilding his factory while the others resolve to continue their battle against Fenris.

The Rusviet Revolution
Shortly after Colonel Zubov's attack on Tesla's factory, revolution erupts in Rusviet as revolutionary forces seek to depose Tsar Nicholas while forces loyal to him try to suppress the revolt. Tsar Nicholas is forced to flee St. Petersburg and seek shelter at a safehouse in the countryside. Olga returns to Rusviet to assist Tsar Nicholas, saving him from a Revolutionary attack and convincing him that Rasputin and Fenris are behind the revolution. Tsar Nicholas decides to return to St. Petersburg to restore order to the country, but as he journeys there, he comes to realize that his Loyalist forces are just as cruel and ruthless towards Rusviet civilians as the Revolutionaries are. Vowing to reform Rusviet, Tsar Nicholas heads for a broadcast tower in St. Petersburg to make an address to the nation while Olga holds off Fenris forces. Unfortunately, Rasputin and Colonel Zubov ambush and kill Tsar Nicholas, declaring the Revolution victorious. With Rusviet now under Fenris' control, Olga is forced to retreat with as many loyal Rusviet soldiers as she can find.

Operation Eagle
In the midst of the Rusviet Revolution, Usonian businesses and interests in the Rusviet-held region of Alaska are put at risk. Admiral George Mason convinces the President to authorize a foreign intervention into Alaska and sends his son Captain William Mason to lead the effort. The campaign is successful and Alaska is occupied by the Usonian army. Admiral Mason then decides to send William to Arabia, which holds massive oil reserves that can benefit Usonian industry greatly. He explains that Arabia is currently occupied by Saxony, and with the previous king and his two sons having been assassinated, the time is ripe for Usonia to send a covert force to Arabia to intervene in the conflict and secure Arabia's oil supply. William however does not care for his father's business connections and is only interested in helping the Arabians overthrow their Saxonian oppressors.

Upon arriving in Arabia, William's airship is shot down and he is rescued by Princess Sita, who leads Arabia's Free Tribes. She explains the current king, her uncle, murdered her father and her brothers in order to secure a treaty with Saxony. They rescue a delegation from Tesla's alliance led by Gunter, who offers to supply Sita with Tesla's mechs in return for oil. Sita remains skeptical about Usonia's offer for help, but is assured by William he came as a liberator, not an occupier. William helps Sita seize the strategic port city of Aqaba, providing the Free Tribes with a major propaganda victory. However, Admiral Mason arrives with forces aligned with Sita's uncle, announcing that Sita's uncle has decided to betray Saxony and sign a treaty with Usonia instead. Sita, Gunter, and their followers are arrested while William and his men are returned to Admiral Mason, who promises to make William the President of Usonia in return for his cooperation. Furious that his father would betray Sita, William goes rogue with his men and stages a rescue mission, freeing Sita and Gunter and allowing them to escape to Tesla's factory. Despite risking being executed as a traitor, William returns to Usonia and exposes his father's secret operation and business ties to a military–industrial complex, causing a massive scandal.

Development
The game was announced in 2016. The game had a successful crowdfunding phase in 2018 which raised over 1.5 million dollars. The 2018 schedule planned for the game release in the fourth quarter of 2019. However, in 2019, the release was pushed back to 2020. In March 2020 a beta version was made available, and in June a demo version of the game was released on Steam. The game was released for Windows on September 1, 2020.  PlayStation 5 and Xbox Series X/S on October 26, 2021.

In December 2020 a DLC expansion Rusviet Revolution was released.

On May 27, 2021, Operation Eagle was released.

Reception 

Reviewing the March 2020 beta version, Colin Campbell of Polygon praised the game for "mak[ing] smart use of units, cover and terrain", positively comparing the game to the Company of Heroes franchise. Likewise, in the same month, Seth Macy of IGN called the game "awesome", praising in particular "detail given to the mechanics of the brick building's collapse". In another early review for PCGamesN, Ian Boudreau commended the game for "staying close to its game design roots", also highlighting visuals, this time the realistic destruction of the wooden buildings.

Following the game release, Toby Arguello in a review for Screen Rant said that "Iron Harvest doesn't revolutionize the RTS genre, but an amazing setting and solid gameplay make it a great addition to an often-ignored genre". Robin Meyer-Lorey reviewing the game for Game Rant wrote that it is "a high-quality RTS with a satisfying amount of content, but gameplay doesn't break out of the standard RTS mold". Rick Lane in a review for PC Gamer concluded that "a worthy spiritual successor to one of the best RTS games ever made". Conversely, in a review for Russian DTF, Daniil Kortez disparaged the game for its apparent negative stereotyping of Russians.

All reviews also positively comment on the visuals related to Różalski's 1920+ dieselpunk and European scenery imaginary.

In January 2020 the game won the "Best German Game" award at the Deutscher Entwickler Preis, and the Developer King Art also won "Best Game Design" and "Best Sound Design" and was nominated for "Best Graphic" and "Best Story".

References

External links 
 

2020 video games
Dieselpunk video games
Real-time strategy video games
Windows games
PlayStation 4 games
PlayStation 5 games
Xbox One games
Xbox Series X and Series S games
Video games set in the 1920s
Video games set in Alaska
Video games set in Germany
Video games set in Jordan
Video games set in Poland
Video games set in Russia
Video games set in Saint Petersburg
Video games set in Saudi Arabia
War video games set in Europe
Alternate history video games
Steampunk video games
Video games about mecha
Multiplayer and single-player video games
Deep Silver games
Video games developed in Germany
King Art Games games
Cultural depictions of Wilhelm II
Cultural depictions of Nicholas II of Russia
Cultural depictions of Grigori Rasputin